Loro Piceno is a comune (municipality) in the Province of Macerata in the Italian region Marche, located about  south of Ancona and about  south of Macerata on a hill near the Fiastra stream.

It is a medieval centre with a castle (Castello Brunforte). Among its churches are:
 Santa Maria delle Grazie, Baroque church 
 San Francesco, Gothic church  
 Sant'Antonio di Padova, 16th century Capuchin church
 Santa Maria in Piazza.

References

External links
 Official website

Castles in Italy